Stefano Turati (born 5 September 2001) is an Italian professional footballer who plays as a goalkeeper for  club Frosinone, on loan from Sassuolo.

Club career
Starting his youth career at Inter Milan, Turati moved to Serie C side Renate in 2017, where he played both in the youth team and as a third-choice goalkeeper in the senior team. Without making his first team debut, Turati moved to Serie A side Sassuolo the following year, where he played as the main goalkeeper in the youth team. On 1 December 2019, aged 18, Turati made his professional debut against Juventus in the league, in a 2–2 draw away from home.

On 13 July 2021, he joined Reggina on a season-long loan. On 4 July 2022, Turati moved on loan to Frosinone.

International career 
On 8 October 2021 he made his debut with the Italy U21 squad, playing as a starter in the qualifying match won 2–1 against Bosnia and Herzegovina in Zenica.

Career statistics

Club

References

External links
 

Italian footballers
2001 births
Living people
Footballers from Milan
Association football goalkeepers
Serie C players
Serie B players
Serie A players
A.C. Renate players
U.S. Sassuolo Calcio players
Reggina 1914 players
Frosinone Calcio players
Italy under-21 international footballers
Italy youth international footballers